Chorizomena is a monotypic moth genus in the family Geometridae. Its only species, Chorizomena nivosa, is found in Australia. Both the genus and species were first described by Turner in 1939.

References

Sterrhinae
Monotypic moth genera